Denis A. Higgs ( – ) was a British mathematician, Doctor of Mathematics, and professor of mathematics who specialised in combinatorics, universal algebra, and category theory. He wrote one of the most influential papers in category theory entitled A category approach to boolean valued set theory, which introduced many students to topos theory.
He was a member of the National Committee of Liberation and was an outspoken critic against the apartheid in South Africa.

Life

He earned degrees from Cambridge University, St John's College, in England, University of the Witwatersrand in South Africa, and McMaster University in Canada.

In 1962, he became a member of the National Committee of Liberation, a movement whose main objective was to dismantle the apartheid in South Africa.

On 28 August 1964, he was kidnapped from his home in Lusaka, Zambia. Then South Africa's Justice Minister John Vorster, who later became Prime Minister, denied any involvement by either the South African government or the police.

On 1 September, an unidentified man who claimed to be part of British Protectorates called the Rand Daily Mail newspaper and gave specific details of Denis Higgs's whereabouts. On 2 September, police authorities found him. He was blindfolded and bound in a van over by the Zoo Park area.

On 6 September 1964, Higgs fled to London, accompanied by his family. He later stated that he feared for his safety and that of his family, since a day before his departure, the South African government had begun proceedings of extradition for his alleged participation in the explosion at the Johannesburg Railway Station.

Career

He emigrated to Canada in 1966, earning a doctorate from McMaster, and held a position as a professor of Pure Mathematics at the University of Waterloo, where he wrote one of the most influential papers in category theory entitled A category approach to boolean valued set theory, which introduced many students to topos theory.

In 1973, he generalised the Rasiowa-Sikorski Boolean models to the case of category theory.

His academic papers were published in Algebra Universalis, the Journal of Pure and Applied Algebra, the Journal of the Australian Mathematical Society, the Journal of the London Mathematical Society, and Mathematics of Computation, among other journals.

He died on 25 February 2011.

Academic publications

References

20th-century British mathematicians
21st-century British mathematicians
South African mathematicians
1932 births
2011 deaths
Place of birth missing
Alumni of St John's College, Cambridge
University of the Witwatersrand alumni
Academic staff of the University of Waterloo
Academic staff of the University of the Witwatersrand